Maria Spirescu (born 2 April 1980) is a Romanian bobsledder. She competed in the two woman event at the 2002 Winter Olympics.

References

External links
 

1980 births
Living people
Romanian female bobsledders
Olympic bobsledders of Romania
Bobsledders at the 2002 Winter Olympics
Sportspeople from Miercurea Ciuc